Devereux Creek is a rural locality in the Mackay Region, Queensland, Australia. In the  Devereux Creek had a population of 381 people.

History 
Devereux Creek Provisional School opened on 20 July 1903. On 1 January 1909 it became Devereux Creek State School. It closed in 1928 and re-opened in 1932 as Deveereaux Creek (spelling variation). It closed permanently in 1970.

In the  Devereux Creek had a population of 381 people.

Geography
The Pioneer River forms the southern boundary.

References 

Mackay Region
Localities in Queensland